Susan Walker may refer to:

Susan Walker (archaeologist)
Susan Walker Fitzgerald, American suffragist
Susan Lalic (née Walker), English chess player

In fiction
Susan Walker, a major character in Coupling
Susan Walker, a major character in Miracle on 34th Street
Susan Walker, a major character in Swallows and Amazons
Susan Walker, a character played by comedian Liam Kyle Sullivan

See also
Sue Walker (disambiguation)